is a Japanese manga series written by Masaru Miyazaki (under the alias Sharakumaro) and illustrated by Takeshi Obata. It was serialized in the Shueisha magazine Weekly Shōnen Jump from May 1995 to January 1996. The chapters were collected into four tankōbon bound volumes. The plot follows Tachibana Sakon, a bunraku puppeteer who solves mysteries with Ukon, a puppet. The manga was adapted into a 26-episode anime television series by Tokyo Movie Shinsha and broadcast on the satellite network WOWOW from October 1999 to March 2000.

Characters

A master puppeteer who likes to travel and solve mysteries along his journeys with his puppet and best friend, Ukon. When he does not have Ukon with him, he is a very timid, humble young boy. However, once he places Ukon on his hand, he develops a careful, quiet, observant and calculating personality. He is displayed as a brilliant young man who can solve any case but feels that sometimes it is best "not to see everything so clearly", and is often underestimated by the criminals because of his young age and occupation as a puppeteer. He is also considered very cute despite his young age, and is often hit on by older women, much to his embarrassment and annoyance. He often worries whenever Ukon is not with him, considering him as his family, and is shown to have a kind heart and will do his best to help those in need. It has been shown that when he was younger, he was often bullied for liking and playing with puppets and that when he was seven, his father committed suicide after injuring another performer's face by accident.

A 100-year-old child doll made in the early Meiji era by a famous puppet maker. When Sakon operates him, he appears to come to life, having a very distinct personality that differs drastically from Sakon's reserved, quiet nature (when he holds Ukon); however, the two continue to have a strong sibling like bond. He is loud, talkative, rude, and likes beautiful girls. He tends to jump to conclusions in his deductions of who the criminal is, and becomes irritated if Sakon does not tell him what he is thinking or who he suspects is the criminal, often relying on him to explain his deduction of the crime. He is also the one to inspire confidence in Sakon and the victims of the case they are trying to solve. He also has the ability to allow the souls of the dead to take possession of his body to listen to their final words before their death, which often comes in handy when solving mysteries.

Sakon's aunt from his mother's side and assistant police detective. She often follows Sakon on his journeys so she can meet handsome men and eat delicious food, and believes herself to be a rare beauty. She also often focuses more on the motives of people involved in a crime rather than their alibis and possible method of murder, which she often relies on Sakon for. She insists that Sakon call her "Kaoruko nee-san" rather than "Kaoruko obaa-san" and hits Ukon whenever he insults her or says a careless remark.

A photographer friend of Sakon's, who sometimes joins him on his travels, and helps in his investigations. He is obsessed with taking pictures, but tends to forget to take them, which Ukon makes note of.

Media

Manga
Karakurizōshi Ayatsuri Sakon is written by Masaru Miyazaki and illustrated by Takeshi Obata. The manga was serialized in Shueisha's Weekly Shōnen Jump from May 22, 1995 to January 1, 1996. Shueisha compiled the individual chapters into four tankōbon volumes released from August 4, 1995 to March 4, 1996.

Volume list

Anime
A 26-episode anime television series produced by Tokyo Movie Shinsha aired on WOWOW from October 8, 1999 to March 31, 2000.

Episode list

References

External links
  Karakurizōshi Ayatsuri Sakon at TMS Entertainment 
 Karakurizōshi Ayatsuri Sakon at WOWOW (archived) 
 

1995 manga
1996 Japanese novels
1999 anime television series debuts
Fictional puppeteers
Jump J-Books
Light novels
Mystery anime and manga
Theatre in anime and manga
Shōnen manga
Shueisha franchises
Shueisha manga
Supernatural anime and manga
Takeshi Obata
TMS Entertainment
Wowow original programming